Dalbergia elegans is a species of plants in the pea family, Fabaceae, subfamily Faboideae. It is found in Brazil.

References

External links 

 Dalbergia elegans at The Plant List
 Dalbergia elegans at Tropicos

elegans
Plants described in 1997
Flora of Brazil